Lower Long Tom is an American Viticultural Area (AVA) located in Oregon's southern Willamette Valley in Lane and Benton Counties, near the towns of Junction City and Monroe. The district was established on December 10, 2021, by the Alcohol and Tobacco Tax and Trade Bureau. It lies entirely within the Willamette Valley AVA. The region is primarily known for its Pinot noir and Pinot gris.

Terroir 
The AVA is located in the southwestern Willamette Valley, among Oregon's coastal foothills. The Long Tom River flows along the eastern boundary of the area. The area is also warmer than surrounding regions, protected from cool marine air by a particularly high section of the Central Oregon Coast Range.

The distinguishing feature of the Lower Long Tom AVA is the predominance of nutrient-poor, fast-draining Bellpine soil in the area, which forces vines to push deep in pursuit of food and water. The harder-working vines are believed to produce lighter leaf canopies and smaller grapes with more concentrated flavors and more powerful tannins.

Wine industry  
As of 2022, the Lower Long Tom is the only nested appellation located in the southern Willamette Valley AVA, in contrast to nine nested appellations in the north. The approval of the AVA enhanced the southern Willamette Valley's legitimacy as an Oregon wine region.
The petition to form the Lower Long Tom AVA was initially filed with the Alcohol and Tobacco Tax and Trade Bureau by Dieter Boehm of High Pass Winery in 2017.

Wineries 
 Antiquum Farm
 Bennett Wine Company
 Benton-Lane Winery
 Brigadoon Wine Co.
 Five Fourteen Vineyards
 Gelardi Vineyard/Poco Collina
 High Pass Winery
 Pfeiffer Winery
 Walnut Ridge Vineyards

References

External links 
 Lower Long Tom AVA
  TTB AVA Map

American Viticultural Areas
Oregon wine
Geography of Lane County, Oregon
Geography of Benton County, Oregon
2021 establishments in Oregon